Stephen George Watkins (born 23 March 1959) was a former English cricketer who played one first-class and one List A match for Worcestershire in 1983.

Watkins' solitary first-class appearance came against Oxford University in the middle of June 1983. Watkins, batting at two, had quite a successful match, scoring 77 and 28.
Nevertheless, he never played first-class cricket again, and his only other game in senior cricket was a John Player Special League match against Kent in early August, in which he made 24.

He left Worcestershire after the 1983 season, but later played minor counties cricket for Wales Minor Counties and Herefordshire.

Notes

References

English cricketers
Worcestershire cricketers
1959 births
Living people
Wales National County cricketers
Herefordshire cricketers